Notable people with given name Newton include:

 Newton (Billy Myers) (b. 1967), a British firefighter turned pop singer
 Newton D. Baker, an American lawyer and politician
 Newton Cloud (1804–1877), an American politician and Methodist minister
 Newton Collins (1819-1903), an American businessman
 Newton da Costa, a Brazilian mathematician, logician and philosopher
 Newton de Souza, a Brazilian businessman
 Newton E. Mason, a United States Navy officer
 Newton Earp, eldest child of Nicholas Porter Earp and Abigail Storm
 Newton Faulkner (born 1985), English singer-songwriter
 Newton "Newt" Gingrich (born 1943), American politician and author
 Newton W. McConnell (1832–1915), Chief Justice of the Territorial Montana Supreme Court
 Newton James Moore, the eighth Premier of Western Australia
 Newton Lee, non-profit entrepreneur and magazine editor
 Newton N. Minow (born 1926), American attorney, former Chairman of the Federal Communications Commission (1961–1963)

English masculine given names